The 2nd annual NFL Honors was an awards show presented by the National Football League to salute the best players and plays from the 2012 NFL season. The event was held at the Mahalia Jackson Theater in New Orleans, Louisiana on February 2, 2013 and was hosted by Alec Baldwin. The show aired on CBS and recorded a 0.9 rating with 3.8 million viewers.

Minnesota Vikings running back Adrian Peterson won four awards, the most of any player. Baldwin's opening monologue, in which he roasted the NFL's biggest stars, was praised. Steve Specht, winner of the Don Shula NFL High School Coach of the Year, was the coach of Luke Kuechly, another award winner, at St. Xavier High School (Cincinnati).

List of award winners

References

NFL Honors 002
2012 National Football League season
2013 sports awards
2013 in American football
2013 in sports in Louisiana
2010s in New Orleans
American football in New Orleans